The , formerly known as the Okinawa Ocean Expo Aquarium, is located within the Ocean Expo Park in Okinawa, Japan. It is a member of the Japanese Association of Zoos and Aquariums (JAZA), and was the largest aquarium in the world until it was surpassed by the Georgia Aquarium in 2005. The aquarium has the exhibit, “Encounter the Okinawan Sea”, which reproduces the sea of Okinawa and most of the creatures that live in it. Churaumi was selected as the name of the aquarium by public vote amongst Japanese people: chura means "beautiful" or "graceful" in the Okinawan language, and umi means "ocean" in Japanese.

History 

Expo '75 was held in Okinawa, Japan, at the Ocean Expo Park, where an aquarium centered on marine life was displayed. In 1976, the Okinawa Ocean Expo Aquarium was established as a national park on the site of the venue.

The Okinawa Ocean Expo Aquarium and the Okichan Theater started operations with the facilities used at the Expo.

The Okinawa Ocean Expo Aquarium is one of the first public aquariums in the world that breeds large sharks and rays such as whale sharks and manta rays. At a symposium held in Baltimore in 1985, the Okinawa Ocean Expo Aquarium was rated to have the most advanced breeding technology in the world for long-term rearing. In 1988, the aquarium won the first Koga Award from JAZA in Japan for breeding two generations of whitetip reef sharks.

As the park lost incoming tourists, it was believed that a new aquarium would help revive the area and celebrate Okinawa's marine tradition. In addition, since the facility was built for a short-term expo, it deteriorated significantly, and a plan to build a new aquarium was proposed.

The Okinawa Ocean Expo Aquarium was closed in August 2002 due to facility deterioration, and the Okinawa Churaumi Aquarium was opened on 1 November 2002, with a new facility designed by Yukifusa Kokuba. The number of visitors in the year before the old aquarium closed was about 430,000, but the number of visitors in the year after the opening of the new building increased to 2.75 million. The number of visitors has continued to increase, with the number of visitors reaching 3,784,132 in 2017 and the cumulative number of visitors reaching 50 million in 2019.

In 2020, the number of tourists in Okinawa Prefecture decreased significantly due to the COVID-19 pandemic.

Aquarium 

The public aquarium is a part of the Ocean Expo Park located in Motobu, Okinawa. The aquarium is made up of four floors, with tanks containing deep sea creatures, sharks, coral, and tropical fish. The aquarium is set on 19,000 m2 of land, with a total of 77 tanks containing 10,000 m3 of water. Water for the saltwater exhibits is pumped into the aquarium from a source 350 m offshore, 24 hours a day.

The Kuroshio Sea 

Whale sharks and manta rays are kept alongside many other fish species in the main tank. Since 2015, the aquarium has also had a reef manta ray with a black body. Since 2018 they also keep giant oceanic manta ray. The world's first birth of a manta ray in captivity was at the aquarium in 2007. This species and the giant oceanic manta ray were only recognized as separate species in 2009; they were both classified as Manta birostris until then. By the time the mother died in 2013, seven puppies were born and four survived. There is a record that the male reef manta ray, which lived in captivity in 1992, lived for about 23 years.

The first attempt of keeping whale sharks in an aquarium was in 1980, and it remains one of the few aquariums that maintains the species. Most were obtained from incidental catches in coastal nets set by fishers (none after 2009), but two were strandings. Several of these were already weak from capture or stranding and some were released, but initial survival rates were low. After the initial difficulties in maintaining the species had been resolved, some have survived long-term in captivity. The record for a whale shark in captivity is an individual that, as of 2021, has lived for more than 26 years in the Okinawa Churaumi Aquarium from Okinawa Ocean Expo Aquarium.

Okinawa Churaumi is trying to breed whale sharks in captivity, which has never been achieved by an aquarium. Their oldest male reached sexual maturity around 2012 and began to show an interest in females in 2014. There were three whale sharks, but they have been moved to a separate tank to make room for breeding. In 2021, a 13-year-old female whale shark that had been in captivity in the Kuroshio Sea tank was transferred to a medical treatment tank in the sea due to poor health, and later died. The cause of death is thought to be feeding difficulties from skeletal abnormalities in the jaw and a twisted pylorus.

The Coral Sea 
In the Coral Sea tank, 450 colonies of reef-building corals of about 80 species are bred and exhibited. The Coral Sea tank is made to emulate the coral reefs in Motobu. In 2021, the Okinawa Churaumi Aquarium was temporarily closed due to the COVID-19 pandemic, but it was confirmed that Acropora microphthalma gave spawned in the daytime for the first time.

The Shark Research Lab 
Sharks such as bull sharks, tiger sharks, silvertip sharks, and silky sharks are bred in the shark research lab tank. Some bull sharks kept in aquariums have lived for more than 42 years.

In 2016, the aquarium showed an attempt to raise an adult great white shark. The great white shark exhibit was successful, but it died three days later, leading to criticism from animal rights groups. In 2019, aquariums captured a pregnant tiger shark and succeeded in giving birth in a shark research lab tank.

Okichan Theater and Dolphin Lagoon 

Near the aquarium is the Dolphin Show Stadium, called the Okichan Theater, where viewers can touch the animals and watch the show's performance for free. There is also a dolphin contact facility called Dolphin Lagoon, which houses several species of dolphin. The Indo-Pacific bottlenose dolphin named Okichan has been owned since the opening of the Okinawa Ocean Expo Aquarium and has been bred for 45 years as of 2020.

In 2003, the bottlenose dolphin named Fuji's caudal fin was 75% necrotic and had to be resected. The aquarium collaborated with Bridgestone to develop the world's first artificial caudal fin to attach to Fuji. Fuji died of infectious hepatitis in 2014 at an estimated age of 45.

Other activities 

There is a manatee exhibition featuring manatees given to the aquarium by the Mexican government and a sea turtle exhibition. A spawning ground dedicated to sea turtles is set up in the exhibition facility. West Indian manatees have also given birth in the facility.

Research and conservation

At the Churaumi Aquarium, the Okinawa Churashima Foundation supervises conservation activities and conducts animal research. The aquarium has won the breeding award  from JAZA for 26 kinds of animals, such as the reef manta ray and Indo-Pacific bottlenose dolphin. In particular, it is characterized by the large breeding of large sharks and rays, which are rare in other locations.

The Churaumi Aquarium collects blood from wild whale sharks, measures the total length and circumference of the body, collects tissues for DNA analysis and chemical analysis, and observes behavior in the natural sea using electronic labels to obtain important information on the breeding habits and ecology of whale sharks. It also conducts tests for future breeding, such as monitoring the behavior of whale sharks during breeding and the concentration of hormones in the blood obtained by blood sampling.

The aquarium is conducting research on the diversity of marine life found around Okinawa, and is engaged in activities that contribute to the conservation and sustainable use of the natural environment.

The aquarium is investigating many humpback whales with local people and domestic and foreign researchers. In a joint study with the Philippines in 2021, it was revealed that 43.48% of the humpback whales around the Philippines were the same as the individuals confirmed in Okinawa and were moving between the two waters, revealing the migration route of humpback whales between Okinawa and the Philippines from the previously unknown Russia feeding ground.　

As a research institute, the public aquarium contributes to the discovery of new species of marine life. New species discovered in the past include Eumunida balteipes, Hexagonaloides bathyalis, and Synactinernus churaumi, a new species of sea anemone that has been studied for over 15 years.

Gallery
Exterior

Aquarium

Main tank aquarium

Okichan Theater

Sea turtle and manatees

See also
 Tropical & Subtropical Arboretum

References

External links

  (Japanese)
  (English)
 Churaumi Official Fish Encyclopedia(Japanese)
 Churaumi Official Fish Encyclopedia(English)
 Ocean Park Homepage in English
 
 
 
 
 Bus Timetable from Asahibashi Sta. to the Aquarium
 

Zoos established in 2002
2002 establishments in Japan
Aquaria in Japan
Articles containing video clips
Buildings and structures in Okinawa Prefecture
Tourist attractions in Okinawa Prefecture